First Congregational Church is located in Ripon, Wisconsin. The church was built in the Romanesque Revival architecture style between 1865 and 1868. It was designed by E. Townsend Mix. On September 4, 1979, it was added to the National Register of Historic Places for its architectural significance.

References

Churches on the National Register of Historic Places in Wisconsin
Churches in Fond du Lac County, Wisconsin
Congregational churches in Wisconsin
Romanesque Revival church buildings in Wisconsin
Churches completed in 1864
Ripon, Wisconsin
National Register of Historic Places in Fond du Lac County, Wisconsin